Yuguang Street Church is a Protestant church in Dalian, China. It is the former Dalian Anglican Church and its church building is now a Historical Protected Building of Dalian City.

Brief history
 From 1905 to 1945, the southern half of the present-day Greater Dalian was Japan's leased territory. Due to the Anglo-Japanese Alliance at that time, the British Consulate General was given a location at Zhongshan Square, the best place in downtown Dalian, and an Anglican church was built in its premises. It was a black brick building.
 In 1928, the second-generation red-brick church building was built by a joint effort of the Church of England and the Anglican-Episcopal Church of Japan, which was named Dalian Anglican Church. On Sunday, the English-language service started at 9:00 am and the Japanese-language service at 10:30 am. The church belonged to the North China Diocese of the Anglican-Episcopal Province of China.
 At the end of the Second World War, all Japanese-owned buildings were confiscated by the Chinese, the religious buildings were never used as such, but as Britain owned the half of this church, it was left as a Christian church and was renamed "Yuguang Street Church".
 During the Cultural Revolution of 1966-1977 when all religious activities were suppressed, the stained glass windows were smashed broken and the church was used as a place for the children's extracurricular activities.
 As Christian service restarted in the early 1980s, the church came under the post-denominational China Christian Council.
 In 2001, it was listed as one of Dalian City's 100 or so Protected Historical Buildings.

At This Church Today
 Address: No. 2, Yuguang Street, Dalian City, Liaoning Province 116001
 Except for the Anglican altar which was taken away and the stained glass windows that were smashed broken and replaced by regular windows, the building is almost as it was in 1928.
 The cornerstone on the right of the church entrance can be read in English (on the left side of the stone) and Japanese (on the right side, written vertically), as:

TO THE GLORY OF GOD
THIS STONE WAS DEDICATED.
MAY 6TH. 1928

BY
FRANCIS LUSHINGTON NORRIS D.D.
BISHOP IN NORTH CHINA
 Weekly services are held on Friday evening (for the youth) and three times on Sunday.
 Baptism is done usually on Sunday a week or two before Christmas Day or Easter.
 A Christmas program including the 50-member chorus is held on Christmas Eve.  On Christmas Day, no service is held, but the song and dance programs are held from morning till a little after noon.

See also

 Christianity and Protestantism
 Christianity in China, Protestantism in China and Chung Hua Sheng Kung Hui
 Church of England and Anglican-Episcopal Church of Japan
 Christian churches in Dalian:
Yuguang Street Church, Beijing Street Church, Dalian Catholic Church, etc

 Some Christian churches in Northeast China:
Catholic: Dalian Catholic Church, Sacred Heart Cathedral of Shenyang, St. Theresa's Cathedral of Changchun, Sacred Heart Cathedral of Harbin, etc.; Protestant: Yuguang Street Church, Dongguan Church, Changchun Christian Church, Harbin Nangang Christian Church, Fushun Zhonghelu Church, etc.; and Eastern Orthodox: Church of the Intercession in Harbin, etc.

References

External links
Yuguang Street Church in Dalain (The Protestant Church in China)  (in Chinese)
China Christian Council home page in Chinese and English
Christian churches and theological seminaries (addresses and phone numbers) (China Christian Council,  in Chinese)

Dalian Yuguang
Former Anglican churches in China
Dalian Yuguang
Churches in Dalian
Dalian Yuguang